Kherbet al-Souk is an area on the outskirts of Amman, Jordan and part of the Greater Amman Municipality. In the 2015 census it had a population 186,158. In the 1915 Ottoman census it had a population of seven, all Muslims.

References 

 

Populated places in Amman Governorate